Ethel Pritchard  (née Watkins, 1880–1964), also known as Ethel Watkins Taylor, was a New Zealand military and civilian nurse. Of Māori descent, she identified with the Ngāpuhi iwi. She was born in Onehunga, Auckland, New Zealand, in 1880.

In the 1949 King's Birthday Honours, Pritchard was appointed a Member of the Order of the British Empire for long services as a district nurse and an honorary child welfare officer.

References

1880 births
1964 deaths
New Zealand military personnel
New Zealand Māori nurses
New Zealand nurses
Ngāpuhi people
New Zealand Members of the Order of the British Empire
New Zealand women nurses
People from Onehunga